Radwanice may refer to the following places in Lower Silesian Voivodeship, Poland:
Radwanice, Polkowice County
Radwanice, Wrocław County